Sigurd Emanuel Hoel (15 August 1897 – 21 July 1977) was a Norwegian boxer who competed in the 1920 Summer Olympics. In 1920 he was eliminated in the quarter-finals of the heavyweight class after losing his fight to Xavier Eluère.

References

External links
 List of Norwegian boxers

1897 births
1977 deaths
Heavyweight boxers
Olympic boxers of Norway
Boxers at the 1920 Summer Olympics
Norwegian male boxers
20th-century Norwegian people